Gargano is an Italian surname. Notable people with the surname include:

Andrea Gargano (1887–1970), Italian sport wrestler
Camillo Gargano (born 1942), Italian sailor
Charles A. Gargano (born 1934), Italian-born former U.S. Ambassador to Trinidad and Tobago
Francesco Gargano (1899–1975), Italian fencer
Giuseppina Gargano (1853-1939), Italian opera singer
Johnny Gargano (born 1987), American professional wrestler
Maria Teresa Gargano (born 1986), Italian artistic gymnast
Margherita Gargano (born 1952), Italian middle-distance runner
Mario Gargano (died 2018), Italian politician, and Deputy from 1972 to 1983
Nicholas Gargano (1934–2016), English boxer
Reinaldo Gargano (1934–2013), Uruguayan politician
Walter Gargano (born 1984), Uruguayan footballer

Italian-language surnames